The Melanocharitidae, the berrypeckers and longbills, is a small bird family restricted to the forests of New Guinea. The family contains eleven species in four (sometimes three) genera. They are small songbirds with generally dull plumage but a range of body shapes.

Taxonomy and systematics
The identification of the family Melanocharitidae was not known or suspected until the work of Sibley and Ahlquist on the taxonomy of birds using DNA–DNA hybridization The genera had been instead placed with other families. The two genera of berrypecker had been placed inside the flowerpecker family Dicaeidae, and the longbills were once considered to be honeyeaters (which they closely resemble). Sibley and Ahlquist placed the berrypeckers and longbill family close to the painted berrypeckers (Paramythiidae), sunbirds and flowerpeckers, but a 2002 study found them closer to the satinbirds (Cnemophilidae, a recent split from the birds-of-paradise).

It comprises ten species in four genera,  the Melanocharis berrypeckers and the longbills in the genera Toxorhamphus and Oedistoma. The two longbill genera are sometimes incorrectly lumped into the same genus, Toxorhamphus, in spite of Oedistoma being erected forty years prior to Toxorhamphus (a violation of the taxonomic principal of priority). There are both molecular and morphological reasons to keep the two genera separate, however. A 1993 study of the longbills, berrypeckers and some other aberrant honeyeaters found that the spectacled longbill was more closely related to the berrypeckers than the two longbills in the genus Toxorhamphus. There are also some morphological differences in the shape of the tarsus.  The two species in Oedistoma, however, may not be closely related and more research is needed. The spotted berrypecker is placed in its own genus Rhamphocharis, while some treatments lump it with the Melanocharis  berrypeckers it is anatomically and behaviourally distinct.

There is some confusion with the common names, as there are two other berrypecker species in the tiny family Paramythiidae, once considered to be close to the flowerpeckers as well; members of several African genera—notably species in the Old World warbler genus Macrosphenus—are also known as longbills.

Description
The berrypeckers and longbills are small to very small songbirds. The berrypeckers (Melanocharis) are usually bigger than the Toxorhamphus and Oedistoma longbills. The females of two species, the fan-tailed and streaked berrypecker, are unique amongst songbirds in that they exhibit a reversal in the usual pattern of sexual dimorphism, with the females being both longer and heavier. For example, in the fan-tailed berrypecker the male weighs , whereas the female weighs .

They have drab-coloured plumage in greys, browns or black and white. The berrypeckers exhibit some sexual dimorphism in their plumage. The berrypeckers resemble stout short-billed honeyeaters, and the longbills are like drab sunbirds or short-tailed honeyeaters. The calls of the berrypeckers have been described as high pitched and faint, and the song rapid.

Distribution and habitat
The berrypeckers are generally montane species, with only one, the black berrypecker, being found in lowland forest. In contrast the longbills live in lowland forests and low montane forests as well as on small islands around New Guinea. Amongst the berrypeckers there is a succession of species at different altitudes, with the black berrypecker being found in the lowlands, the mid-mountain berrypecker being found at lower altitudes (mid-montane) and the fan-tailed berrypecker being found near the treeline.

Behaviour
Melanocharitidae species are usually seen alone or in pairs.  They may associate with mixed-species feeding flocks, but are loose members and not core species. The diet of the family is dominated by berries and small fruits. Arthropods are also gleaned from foliage, and more rarely by hovering and snatching. They are highly active feeders, seldom pausing except when at berries. Most species feed in the lower and middle levels of the forest, although records suggest that the obscure berrypecker will enter the canopy to forage. The male black berrypecker will also enter the canopy, while the female will remain lower down in the forest, suggesting some level of sexual segregation of feeding niches.

The breeding of some species is entirely undescribed, and little is known about the breeding in most species. Records of nests have been made in both wet and dry seasons.  They build a cup nest, usually on a forked branch near the edge of a tree, out of fern scales and plant fibres bound neatly with insect or spider silk and ornamented with lichens. Little is known about the division of labour in the family, although the pattern exhibited by the black berrypecker, where the female constructs the nest alone but both sexes feed the young, may be typical of the family.  They lay one or two eggs.

Status
The berrypeckers and longbills are not considered to be threatened by human activities. No species is listed as threatened by the IUCN, although one species, the obscure berrypecker, is listed as data deficient. That species is known officially from two collected specimens, but unconfirmed reports suggest that it is not uncommon in remote parts of New Guinea.

Species
Melanocharis, Sclater, 1858
 Obscure berrypecker, Melanocharis arfakiana 
 Black berrypecker, Melanocharis nigra
 Mid-mountain berrypecker, Melanocharis longicauda 
 Fan-tailed berrypecker, Melanocharis versteri 
 Streaked berrypecker, Melanocharis striativentris
Rhamphocharis, Salvadori, 1876
 Thick-billed berrypecker, Rhamphocharis crassirostris
Spotted berrypecker, Rhamphocharis piperata
 Toxorhamphus, Stresemann, 1914
 Yellow-bellied longbill, Toxorhamphus novaeguineae
 Slaty-headed longbill, Toxorhamphus poliopterus
 Oedistoma, Salvadori, 1876
 Spectacled longbill, Oedistoma iliolophus
 Pygmy longbill, Oedistoma pygmaeum

The pygmy and spectacled longbills are sometimes included in the genus Toxorhamphus.

References

External links
Melanocharitidae at The Internet Bird Collection.

 
Bird families
Higher-level bird taxa restricted to New Guinea
Passeri